East Fork Township may refer to the following townships in the U.S. state of North Dakota:

East Fork Township, Benson County, North Dakota
East Fork Township, Williams County, North Dakota

See also

East Fork Township (disambiguation)

North Dakota township disambiguation pages